Psoronactis is a monotypic fungal genus in the family Roccellaceae. It contains the single species Psoronactis dilleniana, a saxicolous (rock-dwelling), crustose lichen. This species was first described in 1799 by Swedish lichenologist Erik Acharius as Lichen dillenianus. The taxon was shuffled to several genera in the 1800s as different authors had different opinions on how to classify the species; in more modern times, it was transferred to genus Lecanographa in 2013. Psoronactis was circumscribed in 2014 by Damien Ernst and Anders Tehler, following molecular phylogenetic analysis and revision of the Roccellaceae that showed the species occupied a distinct lineage in the family. The genus name alludes to the  lichen products present in its thallus: psoromic acid and 2'-O-demethylpsoromic acid. It is these compounds that differentiate it chemically from the similar genus Lecanactis.

References

Roccellaceae
Lichen genera
Taxa described in 2014
Arthoniomycetes genera